Daniel Miller House may refer to:

Daniel Miller House (Dayton, Ohio), listed on the National Register of Historic Places in Dayton, Ohio
Daniel Miller House (West Lafayette, Ohio), listed on the National Register of Historic Places in Coshocton County, Ohio